Marler Clark, LLP is a Seattle, Washington based law firm specializing in foodborne illness litigation on the national level specifically focusing on foodborne illnesses such as E. coli, Salmonella, and Listeria.

The firm was founded in 1998 by William Marler, Denis Stearns and Bruce Clark. They were the primary attorneys for both the plaintiff and defense in the litigation stemming from the 1993 Jack in the Box outbreak of E. coli.

Marler Clark has represented victims of foodborne illness against multiple companies.

References

External links
Marler Clark Official Website

Law firms based in Seattle